William Bertrand Stevens (19 November 1884 - 22 August 1947) was second bishop of the Episcopal Diocese of Los Angeles, serving from 1928 to 1947. He had previously served as coadjutor bishop from 1920 to 1928. He was a member of Phi Beta Kappa, Sons of the American Revolution, the Society of Colonial Wars, the Society of the Descendants of the Colonial Clergy, Phi Gamma Delta, Pi Epsilon Theta, Theta Phi, Phi Mu Alpha, the University Club in Pasadena, the Los Angeles Athletic Club, the Jonathan Club, Knights Templar, Red Cross of Constantine, Masons, and Sons of the Revolution.

Stevens graduated from Bates College, then attended Cambridge Theological School and graduated in 1910 and later received an MA from Columbia and a PhD from NYU. Stevens was consecrated at St. Paul's Cathedral in Los Angeles when he was 35 years old. He was general chaplain for the General Society Sons of the Revolution 1940–1947.

He was a trustee of Scripps College, Occidental College, the Harvard School, and the Bishop's School. He received an honorary doctorate from UC in 1921 and Bates College in 1922. He was a Major Chaplain in the US Army Reserve, he was a field director for the American Red Cross, and a captain in the California Naval Militia.

Family 
Stevens married Violet Heathcote Bond. They had 4 daughters Ellen(Prince), Ann(McNair), Edith(Haney), and Emily(Hall).

Death and burial 
Stevens died of complications following surgery at the Good Samaritan Hospital in Los Angeles. He is buried in San Gabriel Cemetery, in San Gabriel, California.

External links 

1884 births
1947 deaths
20th-century American Episcopalians
Episcopal bishops of Los Angeles